The 2018 Orange, County, California District Attorney election took place on June 5, 2018 for the first round. Because no candidate received a majority in the first round, a runoff took place November 6, 2018, to elect the Orange County, California District Attorney. County-level elections in California are officially nonpartisan. Because no candidate received a majority, a runoff was held on November 6, 2018.

Incumbent District Attorney Tony Rackauckas is running for a sixth term. Rackauckas was re-elected in 2014 with 73% of the vote in 2014.

In July 2017, Orange County Supervisor Todd Spitzer declared that he will challenge Rackauckas due to scandals within the Orange County District Attorney's office.

In May 2018, former mayor of Brea Brett Murdock declared candidacy.

Rackauckas has faced criticism for allegedly mishandling jailhouse informants, making it more difficult to convict and sentence defendants.

On September 22, 2017, Scott Dekraai was sentenced to eight terms of life in prison without the possibility of parole, one term for each of his victims and to seven years to life for attempted murder in a Seal Beach salon shooting. The jailhouse informant scandal allegedly involving Rackauckas made it impossible to seek the death penalty for Dekraai.

The American Civil Liberties Union filed a complaint claiming the alleged widespread use of jailhouse informants by Orange County law enforcement officeholders has continued for decades. The United States Department of Justice and California Attorney General's office both launched probes investigating the jailhouse informant case. As of April 4, 2018, no charges have been filed against any Orange County law enforcement official.

On April 26, 2018, a forum for candidates sponsored by conservative PAC Hispanic 100 was held.

Assistant Orange County Public Defender Scott Sanders claims California Attorney General Xavier Becerra and United States Attorney General Jeff Sessions have turned a blind eye to the use of jailhouse informants. Sanders discovered that more than 140 cases might have been mishandled due to the use of jailhouse informants. Sanders claims that it is the largest jailhouse informant scandal in United States history.

On November 6, 2018, Spitzer, a Republican, defeated incumbent Republican Rackauckas, denying Rackauckas a sixth term.

Candidates
 Note: County elections in California are officially nonpartisan. The parties below identify which party label each candidate would have run under if given the option.

Declared
 Lenore Albert-Sheridan(Democratic Party)
 Brett Murdock, former Mayor of Brea (Democratic Party)
 Tony Rackauckas, incumbent District Attorney (Republican Party)
 Todd Spitzer, Orange County Supervisor (Republican Party)

General election

Endorsements

Results

Results by county supervisorial district
Rackauckas won all 5 county supervisorial districts by varying margins. Orange represents county supervisorial districts won by Rackauckas.

Runoff

Endorsements

Results

Results by county supervisorial district
Spitzer won all 5 county supervisorial districts. Red represents county supervisorial districts won by Spitzer.

References

External links
Official campaign websites
Tony Rackauckas for District Attorney
Todd Spitzer for District Attorney

Orange County District Attorney
Orange County District Attorney
Orange County District Attorney